The  2015 Formula Lites season was the inaugural season of the Formula Lites series, an open wheel motor racing championship powered by Honda and sanctioned by the Sports Car Club of America (SCCA). It began on 30 May at the Thompson Speedway in Thompson, Connecticut and ended on 20 September at the MSR Houston in Angleton, Texas, after six double-header rounds.

Teams and competitors

Race calendar and results

Drivers' championship

Scoring system

 The driver who qualifies on pole is awarded two additional points.
 An additional point is awarded to each driver who leads a lap in a race.

 Ties in points broken by number of wins, or best finishes.

References

External links
Official website

Formula Lites